The Old Academy is an historic building in Perth, Scotland. Located on Rose Terrace, overlooking the southern end of the North Inch, it is a Category A listed building, built between 1803 and 1807. It was the home of Perth Academy between 1807 and 1932.

Perth's lord provost Thomas Hay Marshall was involved with its design, by Robert Reid, four years before his death.

The building formerly housed the 1696-founded Perth Academy (at the time specialising mostly in Maths and the sciences), the Grammar (specialising in mostly Classics, History and Philosophy), the English School, the French school, the Drawing and Painting school, and the Writing school. Together they were known as the public Seminaries.

The building's balustraded parapet with a clock and statues of Britannia and a British Lion was added in 1886, the work of sculptor William Birnie Rhind. His father, John Rhind, died in Perth three years later.

Andrew Granger Heiton made additions in 1907, and Donald Alexander Stewart made alterations to the academy's preparatory department in 1908.

Perth Academy moved to its current location, in the Viewlands area of the city, in 1932.

See also
List of Category A listed buildings in Perth and Kinross
List of listed buildings in Perth, Scotland

Gallery

References

External links
Perth, 6, 7 Rose Terrace, Old Academy – Canmore.org.uk

1807 establishments in Scotland
Listed buildings in Perth, Scotland
Category A listed buildings in Perth and Kinross
Schools in Perth, Scotland